The Southern Tier Line is a railroad line owned and operated by the Norfolk Southern Railway in the U.S. states of New York and Pennsylvania. A mostly former Erie Railroad line, it is suggested that the line runs from Suffern, New York northwest to Buffalo, New York as it shares trackage with Metro-North Railroad’s Port Jervis Line from Suffern to Port Jervis; NS owns the Suffern to Port Jervis trackage and leases it to Metro-North so it can maintain it for its Port Jervis Line passenger operation. From its east end, NS has trackage rights south on the New Jersey Transit Main and Bergen County Lines to Conrail's North Jersey Shared Assets Area.

From Port Jervis to Binghamton, the line is leased to and maintained by the Central New York Railroad, part of the Delaware Otsego Corporation. It junctions with the Lake Erie District at its west end. Along the way it meets the Corning Secondary at Corning, New York.

History
The oldest piece of the line, from Suffern to Newburgh Junction in Woodbury, New York, opened in 1841 as part of the New York and Erie Rail Road. Extensions opened to Port Jervis and Binghamton in 1848, Owego in 1849, and Dunkirk (leaving the Southern Tier Line at Hornell) in 1851. At the Buffalo end, the Attica and Buffalo Railroad opened from Buffalo east to Attica in 1842, but was part of the New York Central Railroad system until 1852, when it was sold to the Buffalo and New York City Railroad east of Depew. Also in 1852, the Buffalo and New York City Railroad built southeast from Attica to Hornell and west from Depew to Buffalo. The entire line became part of the Erie Railroad through leases and mergers.

A small part of the line, from East Corning west through Corning to Painted Post, is not the former Erie but the former Delaware, Lackawanna and Western Railroad, opened in 1882 by the New York, Lackawanna and Western Railroad. After the Erie and Lackawanna merged to form the Erie-Lackawanna Railroad, that portion of the former Erie was abandoned and traffic was rerouted to the ex-Lackawanna. The EL was taken over by Conrail in 1976, and in the 1999 Conrail breakup the Southern Tier Line was assigned to Norfolk Southern.

References

Norfolk Southern Railway lines
Erie Railroad
Delaware, Lackawanna and Western Railroad

Rail infrastructure in New York (state)
Rail infrastructure in Pennsylvania
Erie Railroad lines